Palpita cirralis is a moth in the family Crambidae. It was described by Charles Swinhoe in 1897. It is found on Borneo.

References

Moths described in 1897
Palpita
Moths of Borneo